Teneriffa spicata is a species of fly in the family Dolichopodidae, and the only member of the genus Teneriffa. It was first described from Tenerife in the Canary Islands, and was later reported from Madeira.

References 

Hydrophorinae
Taxa named by Theodor Becker
Insects of the Canary Islands
Arthropods of Madeira
Insects described in 1908